L'ambassadrice is an opera or opéra comique in 3 acts by composer Daniel Auber. The work's French language libretto was written by Eugène Scribe and Jules-Henri Vernoy de Saint-Georges. The opera's world premiere was staged by the Opéra-Comique at the Théâtre des Nouveautés in Paris on 21 December 1836. It was revived in Paris on 4 January 2013  by the opera company Les Frivolités Parisiennes at the initiative of two research fellows who specialized in nineteenth-century historically informed performance, Pierre Girod (vocal coach) and Charlotte Loriot (stage director).

Roles

References

French-language operas
Opéras comiques
Operas by Daniel Auber
Operas
1836 operas
Opera world premieres at the Opéra-Comique
Libretti by Eugène Scribe